Joie Susannah Lee is an American screenwriter, film producer and actress.

Early years
Lee was born in Brooklyn, New York, the daughter of Jacqueline (née Shelton), a teacher of arts and black literature, and William James Edward Lee III, a jazz musician, bassist, actor and composer.

Career 
She has appeared in many of the films directed by her brother, Spike Lee, including She's Gotta Have It (1986), School Daze (1988), Do the Right Thing (1989), and Mo' Better Blues (1990). She also co-wrote and produced the film Crooklyn (1994). Another movie she appears in is A Kiss Before Dying (1991).

Acting roles

References

External links

Actresses from New York City
African-American actresses
African-American film producers
African-American screenwriters
American film actresses
Film producers from New York (state)
Screenwriters from New York (state)
American television actresses
Living people
People from Brooklyn
Lee family (show business)
American women screenwriters
American women film producers
21st-century African-American people
21st-century African-American women
20th-century African-American people
20th-century African-American women
Year of birth missing (living people)
African-American women writers